Yu Lan (3 June 1921 – 28 June 2020) was a Chinese film actress. In 1961, Yu won the award for Best Actress at the 2nd Moscow International Film Festival for her performance in A Revolutionary Family. Her youngest son is Chinese director and Beijing Film Academy professor Tian Zhuangzhuang.

Life 
Yu was born 1921 in Xiuyan, Liaoning as Yu Peiwen. She entered Counter-Japanese Military and Political University in 1938 and worked as an actress at a company affiliated with Luxun Academy of Arts after 1940.

She died in Beijing on 28 June 2020, aged 99.

Filmography

References

External links
于蓝：中囯银幕上的红色母亲

1921 births
2020 deaths
Actresses from Liaoning
People from Anshan
Chinese film actresses
Counter-Japanese Military and Political University alumni
20th-century Chinese actresses